Loricaria cuffyi is a species of catfish in the family Loricariidae. It is native to South America, where it occurs in the Essequibo River and Rio Negro basins in Guyana, as well as the Orinoco basin in Venezuela, with its type locality being designated as the Ireng River. The species was described on the basis of 36 specimens in 2020 by Alejandro Londoño-Burbano (of the Federal University of Rio de Janeiro), Alexander Urbano-Bonilla (of the Pontifical Xavierian University), and Matthew R. Thomas (of the Kentucky Department of Fish and Wildlife Resources). FishBase does not yet list this species.

References 

Loricariidae

Freshwater fish of Venezuela
Fish of Guyana
Fish described in 2020
Catfish of South America